Hinduism is the majority religion in Jharkhand, followed by nearly 67.83% of total population as of 2011 census. There has also been a significant population of followers of Islam and Sarnaism, with 14.53% and 12.52% respectively and Christianity being a significant minority, followed by 4.3%. A small numbers of Sikhs and other religion are also present.

Overview 
Jharkhand is a diverse state of India and has a diverse religious population, where the majority of the population follows Hinduism, with Islam as the second most followed religion. The state has also a very high proportion of tribal population, where the majority religion is Sarnaism. In the recent times, due to the missionary activities, there has been a significant rise of Christianity in Jharkhand which is more than the national average population of Christians in India. A small community of Agrahari Sikh and Jains.

Demographics

See also 

 Agrahari Sikh
 Christianity in Jharkhand

References 

 
Religion in Jharkhand
Religion in India by state or union territory